84th meridian may refer to:

84th meridian east, a line of longitude east of the Greenwich Meridian
84th meridian west, a line of longitude west of the Greenwich Meridian